Port d'Envalira (el. 2408 m.) is a mountain pass in the Pyrenees in Andorra, that connects El Pas de la Casa with the rest of the country. It is the highest paved road in the Pyrenees. The climb has been featured several times at the Tour de France and Vuelta a España cycling races.

The construction of a toll tunnel to avoid the mountain pass started in 1999 and opened to traffic in 2002. The tunnel is located at an altitude of about 2000 meters and is nearly 3 kilometers long.

See also
 List of highest paved roads in Europe
 Souvenir Henri Desgrange

External links
Port d'Envalira profile from Andorra la Vella - climbbybike.com
Port d'Envalira profile from Ax les Thermes - climbbybike.com
Port d'Envalira profile from Latour Carol - climbbybike.com
Le Port d'Envalira dans le Tour de France 
Port d'Envalira on Google Maps (Tour de France classic climbs)

References

Mountain passes of Andorra
Mountain passes of the Pyrenees